The Next Star was a Canadian reality competition television series that was broadcast on YTV. It was hosted by Adamo Ruggiero (seasons 1–5) and Carlos Bustamante (season 6–7). The series involved a competition to find the most talented singer in Canada who is aged 15 years or younger, with the winner crowned "the next star". Winning contestants were Dunnery Bond (season 1), Tianda Flegal (season 2), Diego Gomes (season 3), Melissa "Charlie" Storwick (season 4), Brooklyn Roebuck (season 5), Alicia Moffet (season 6) and Jory Zechner (season 7).

In addition to host Adamo Ruggiero (2008–2012), the judges for the first 4 seasons (2008–2011) included Suzie McNeil, Steve Cranwell, and Christopher Ward. The subsequent judges (2012–2014) were Keshia Chanté, Mark Spicoluk, and Tara Oram.  Season 5 aired on YTV from July 16 to September 23, 2012. The stylists and coaches (2008–2014) were Jasmine Denham-Baird (vocal coach), Michael Riccio (dance and choreography), Peter Papapetrou (clothes and wardrobe), and Dee Daly (hair and makeup stylist).

As of season 6, Carlos Bustamante (host of YTV's The Zone) replaced the show's former host, Adamo Ruggiero, and web host Mark "Suki" Suknanan was added to the cast.

On September 22, 2013, YTV announced that The Next Star was getting a spin-off show, entitled The Next Star – Supergroups. The first episode premiered March 11, 2014. The season one finale premiered April 13, 2014.

On March 5, 2014, the show's Facebook page confirmed that The Next Star would have a seventh and final season. and premiered on July 14 to September 21, 2014. Season 7 has Dan Kanter replacing Keshia Chanté as a judge.

Season 1 (2008)

Top 6
These were the top 100 contestants of season one.  It was soon announced that 11-year-old Charlotte Kosc had been diagnosed with viral meningitis and pneumonia in her right lung and therefore couldn't continue in the competition (she had been chosen to carry on as one of the top six). Amanda Rowland was selected as a replacement. 
 Alyssa Reid, then age 15
 Briar Gillis, then age 14 
 Christina LeClair, then age 13, 14 at the finale
 Dunnery Bond, then age 14
 Maranda Thomas, then age 11
Amanda Rowland, then age 14

Singles
Each of the six finalists also got to record a single, available on iTunes or on the show's season one compilation EP.

Episodes
The first three episodes consisted of auditions and narrowing the top 12 down to 6 finalists.

Season 2 (2009)
The second season of "The Next Star!" premiered on July 17, 2009. Suzie McNeil, Steve Cranwell and Christopher Ward all returned as judges, and Adamo Ruggiero returned as host.

Format
This season's format is very similar to the previous one, with the judges and host traveling to 6 different locations throughout Canada to find their top contestants. But, unlike Season 1, the judges chose 16 contestants to move on to the semi-finals, as opposed to Season 1's Top 12. The winner received a grand prize package valued at over $6 million Canadian dollars including studio time at Metalworks Studios, to write and record two additional songs (not including the one performed on the show). These songs were produced by Universal Canada, and released in spring 2010. They will also have their own showcase at the premier annual Canadian Music Week Showcase, where they will debut their songs; as well as receiving a J-45 Standard Acoustic Guitar and an Epiphone Valve Jr. Combo Amp courtesy of Gibson Guitars. The season's compilation EP was released in October 2009.

The September 27 finale, from International Showplace at Canada's Wonderland, featured performances by FeFe Dobson and Justin Bieber, who had recently earned his first hit with "One Time", but not yet released an album.

Top 6
The Top 6 was revealed to Canada on August 7, 2009.
 Wren Burnett, then age 13
 Tianda Flegal, then age 13
 Lizz Kellermann, then age 14
 Darrelyne Bickel, then age 15
 Rayandra Hudson, then age 13 at the audition, then 14 throughout the show and final
 Brock Zanrosso, then age 14

Singles
Each of the six finalists also got to record a single, which are available on iTunes or on the show's season two compilation EP.

Season 3 (2010)
The Next Star returns with a third season. Host Adamo Ruggiero, Judges Suzie McNeil, Steve Cranwell, and Christopher Ward. This contains the first Christmas themed episode. The song was "All I Want For Christmas Is You" by Mariah Carey.

The Top 6

Singles

The top six were called back to Toronto once again around December to perform a top 6 group music video of the Christmas song "All I Want For Christmas is You".

Season 4 (2011)
The fourth season of The Next Star premiered on July 18, 2011. All three judges and host Adamo returned for the season. The season got a new logo – a big star with the show title on it. This season also had a new intro and the theme was slightly modified for the opening title sequence. For the first time since the first season, Calgary, Alberta was one of the 6 audition cities.

The Top 6 were revealed to Canada August 2011.
 Melissa "Charlie" Storwick, then age 12
 Shania Fillmore, then age 15
 Milly Benzu, then age 15
 April Llave, then age 13
 JD Meeboer, then age 15, (deceased May 27, 2021)
 Parker Schmidt, then age 12

Singles

Season 5 (2012)
Adamo Ruggiero returned as the host for season 5, with Keshia Chanté, Mark Spicoluk, and Tara Oram as new judges. The season premiered on July 16, 2012. This season the show also hit over 6500 followers on Twitter and 60,000 likes on their Facebook. A new part is "The Wild Card", four people who received a "No" at the auditions are reconsidered and one will get The Wild Card, a chance to continue on. The live finale at Canada's Wonderland was held on September 23, 2012. The 'winners song' for the season was "One Thing" by One Direction. Brooklyn performed the "winners song". In late-September 2012, it was announced that there is going to be another episode of this season titled "48 Hours in the Spotlight". Also, on November 12, 2012, it was announced that there will be a Christmas episode, song and music video with the whole top 6, premiering on December 11, 2012 after Life with Boys: Naughty or Nice with Boys. "48 Hours in the Spotlight" will contain Brooklyn's second single/music video. The 'Winner's Episode' premiered on December 18, 2012. This was the second Christmas episode since Season 3. Pop singer Aleesia performed as a musical guest for the show.

 Brooklyn Roebuck, then age 14
 Darren Espanto, age 10 at auditions, then 11 during the show and final 
 Ryan Hawken, age 14 at auditions, then 15 during the show and final 
 Amer Dhaliwal, then age 15
 Grace Johnston, then age 15
 Issy Dahl, age 14 at auditions, then 15 during the show and final

Choosing the Wild Card 
The judges picked 4 contestants who at first received a "No" at the auditions. Issy then received the Wild Card.

Top 6

Episodes

Singles

Season 6 (2013)
Through their Facebook page, The Next Star has confirmed its return for a sixth season. The announcement was made on March 5, 2013. Adamo Ruggiero is not returning to be a host and Carlos Bustamante will instead be taking over, as confirmed in a video released on March 20, 2013. "The Wild Card" is back. It premiered on July 15, 2013 on YTV. This is the first season to have a finale pre-show.

Top 6

Alicia Moffet, then age 14, Winner
Jaden MacPhee, then age 14 (Finalist) 
Paige Prescott, then age 15 (Finalist)
Alex Zaichkowski, then age 15 (Finalist)
Dante Scott, then age 12 (Finalist) 
Kat Moscone, then age 13 (Finalist)

Episodes

Singles

The Next Star – Supergroup

During commercial break on the season six live finale (September 22, 2013) it was announced there will be The Next Star spin-off titled The Next Star – Supergroup. It was soon after confirmed on the official The Next Star Twitter though nothing was said about it. The Next Star – SuperGroup appears to be similar to The Next Star but The Next Star – SuperGroup is not about solo singers, it is about groups of singers performing. There will be new judges and coaches. Not much is known about it. There will be contestants from other seasons on the show including: Michelle Cavaleri, Parker Schmidt, Shania Fillmore, Isabelle Stern, Amer Dhaliwal, Mimoza Duot, Gary Gordon, Dane Bjornson, Olenka Bak, Bradley Martinez, and Ryan Hawken. The very first episode premiered March 11, 2014. The season one finale premiered April 13, 2014. In the premiere, there was live screening party at Toronto to watch the first episode, attended by the fans of The Next Star, the hosts of the show, and other known members including Carlos Bustamante and Ryan Dizon.

Season 7 (2014)
The Next Star continues for a seventh season and premiered on July 14, 2014. Season 7 has Dan Kanter replacing Keshia Chanté as a judge.

Jory Zechner (Winner), then age 15
Kaleia Simons-Cook (Finalist), age 12 at auditions, then 13 during the show and final
Michaelah Weekes (Finalist), then age 15
Nissita Francis (Finalist), age 12 at auditions, then 13 during the show and final
Ryland Clark (Finalist), age 14 at auditions, then 15 during the show and final
Shon Burnett (Finalist), then age 12

Singles

References

External links
 

2000s Canadian music television series
2010s Canadian music television series
2000s Canadian reality television series
2010s Canadian reality television series
Canadian children's musical television series
Canadian children's reality television series
YTV (Canadian TV channel) original programming
2008 Canadian television series debuts
2014 Canadian television series endings
Television series by Corus Entertainment
2000s Canadian children's television series
2010s Canadian children's television series
Television series about children
Television series about teenagers